Darshan Ranganathan (4 June 1941 – 4 June 2001) was an organic chemist from India who was known for her work in bio-organic chemistry, including "pioneering work in protein folding." She was also recognized for her work in "supramolecular assemblies, molecular design, chemical simulation of key biological processes, synthesis of functional hybrid peptides and synthesis of nanotubes."

Early life
Darshan Ranganathan was born Darshan Markan on 4 June 1941 to Vidyavati Markan and Shanti Swarup in Delhi. She was educated in Delhi and received a Ph.D. in chemistry from Delhi University in 1967. First hired as a lecturer, she became head of the Chemistry Department at Miranda College, Delhi, and went on to receive an 1851 Research Fellowship from the Royal Commission for the Exhibition of 1851, to enable her to conduct postdoctoral work at Imperial College London with Professor D.H.R. Barton.

Career
In 1970, she began research at the Indian Institute of Technology, Kanpur (IIT Kanpur). In that year, she married Subramania Ranganathan, with whom she would go on to author Challenging problems in organic reaction mechanisms (1972), Art in biosynthesis: the synthetic chemist's challenge (1976), and Further challenging problems in organic reaction mechanisms (1980)—as well as editing an ongoing series titled "Current Organic Chemistry Highlights".

She continued her research at IIT Kanpur on the basis of fellowships. Unwritten rules prevented her from joining the faculty because her husband was already a member.

She began work at Regional Research Laboratory, Trivandrum in 1993, and at IICT, Hyderabad in 1998., where she became Deputy Director. During these years, she conducted ongoing collaborations with Isabella Karle at the U.S. Naval Research Laboratory.

Darshan Ranganathan was diagnosed with breast cancer in 1997, and died on her 60th birthday, in 2001.

The biennial "Professor Darshan Ranganathan Memorial Lecture", which is to be "delivered by a woman scientist who has made outstanding contributions in any field of Science and Technology" was established in her memory by her husband, in 2001.

Notable accomplishments
She was a Fellow of the National Academy of Sciences. She also won the A.V. Rama Rao Foundation Award, the Jawaharlal Nehru Birth Centenary Visiting Fellowship, Third World Academy of Sciences Award in Chemistry in 1999 for her work in bio-organic chemistry, and the Sukh Dev Endowment Lectureship.

At the time of her passing away, she was the most prolific organic chemist in India, having, in the last five years, a dozen publications in The Journal of the American Chemical Society, six in the Journal of Organic Chemistry and dozens in others. Her monumental con- tribution to the Accounts of Chemical Research was published, as well as many other papers, posthumously. She was elected Fellow of the Indian Academy of Sciences, Indian National Science Academy and the recipient of many honors the last of which was The Third World Academy of Sciences Award in chemistry for her outstanding contributions to bio-organic chemistry, particularly supramolecular assemblies, molecular design, chemical simulation of key biological processes, synthesis of functional hybrid peptides and synthesis of nanotubes, in 1999.

Work
Ranganathan's special passion was reproducing natural biochemical processes in the laboratory. She created a protocol which achieved the autonomous reproduction of imidazole, an ingredient of histadine and histamine with pharmaceutical importance. She also developed a working simulation of the urea cycle. As her career developed, she became a specialist in designing proteins to hold a wide variety of different conformations and designing nanostructures using self-assembling peptides.

References

External links 
 Publications by Darshan Ranganathan , Microsoft Academic Search

1941 births
2001 deaths
Indian biochemists
Indian organic chemists
Delhi University alumni
20th-century Indian chemists
Place of birth missing
20th-century Indian women scientists
Indian women biochemists
20th-century Indian biologists
Women scientists from Delhi
TWAS laureates